Roy Clifford Johnson (18 July 1891 – 8 May 1962) was an Australian rules footballer who played with Carlton in the Victorian Football League (VFL).

He kicked a career high six goals in a win over Richmond at Princes Park in round five, 1911.

In the middle of the 1912 season he transferred to Footscray in the Victorian Football Association, performing well in a side that finished top of the ladder but missed out on playing in the finals due to illness.

Notes

External links 
		
Roy Johnson's profile at Blueseum

1891 births
1962 deaths
Australian rules footballers from Melbourne
Carlton Football Club players
Footscray Football Club (VFA) players
People from Footscray, Victoria